The Tunisian Handball League or the National A is the top Tunisian professional handball. The league started in 1956, just after Tunisia had gained its independence. 12 teams participate in the league, which is the strongest in Africa. The Espérance Sportive de Tunis H.C is the most successful team, and the first team in the world to win a total of 34 titles in its national league, 15 of them consecutively. Club Africain H.C have won 13 titles. Both clubs focus on international competitions rather than the domestic league, however, since they make up the bulk of the national team.

Winners list

Most successful clubs

See also 
Tunisian Handball Cup
Tunisian Women's Handball League
Tunisian Women's Handball Cup

External links 

 Tunisian Handball Champions List

Handball in Tunisia
Tunisia
Sports leagues established in 1956
1956 establishments in Tunisia